Dermot Patrick John O'Brien (28 April 1906 – 7 February 1988) was an Australian rules footballer who played with St Kilda and Hawthorn in the Victorian Football League (VFL).

Notes

External links 

1906 births
Australian rules footballers from Victoria (Australia)
St Kilda Football Club players
Hawthorn Football Club players
Old Xaverians Football Club players
1988 deaths